Archaeonympha is a genus in the family Riodinidae. They are resident in the Americas.

Species list 
 Archaeonympha drepana (Bates, 1868) Guyana, Brazil, Peru.
 Archaeonympha smalli Hall & Harvey, 1998 Panama
 Archaeonympha urichi (Vane-Wright, 1994) French Guiana, Trinidad and Tobago

Sources 
 Archaeonympha at Markku Savela's website on Lepidoptera

Nymphidiini
Butterfly genera